Sergio Litvak Lijavetzky (17 October 1927 – 19 June 2001) was a Chilean football goalkeeper.

Career
Litvak began his professional playing career in Ecuador with Club Sport Emelec in 1947. He played for Club Deportivo Universidad Católica in Chile from 1952 to 1957. Litvak was part of the side that won the 1954 Chilean Primera División and was instrumental winning in the final against Colo-Colo, making the start following an injury to regular goalkeeper Sergio Livingstone. For Universidad Católica, he made forty-nine appearances at league level.

Litvak was selected to play for Chile at the 1952 Summer Olympics in Helsinki, but did not participate in any matches.

References

External links

Ukrainian Football Diaspora @ Sport.ua

1927 births
1987 deaths
Chilean people of Ukrainian descent
Chilean people of Ukrainian-Jewish descent
Chilean footballers
Olympic footballers of Chile
Footballers at the 1952 Summer Olympics
C.S. Emelec footballers
Chilean Primera División players
Primera B de Chile players
Club Deportivo Universidad Católica footballers
Chilean expatriate footballers
Chilean expatriate sportspeople in Ecuador
Expatriate footballers in Ecuador
Association football goalkeepers